In the Forest of Huckybucky is a 2016 Norwegian stop-motion animated musical film directed by Rasmus A. Sivertsen from a screenplay by Karsten Fullu, based on the 1953 children's book The Climbing Mouse and the Other Animals in Hakkebakkeskogen by Thorbjørn Egner. Released in Norwegian cinemas on 25 December 2016, it was produced by Sivertsen's Qvisten Animation.

Voice cast 
Espen Bråten Kristoffersen as Klatremus
Wenche Myhre as Bestemor Skogmus
Nils Jørgen Kaalstad as Morten Skogmus
Henriette Faye-Schjøll as Stabbursmusa
Stig Henrik Hoff as Mikkel Rev
Jan Martin Johnsen as Bakemester Harepus
Jakob Schøyen Andersen as Bakergutten
Ivar Nørve as Bamsefar
Marit Synnøve Berg as Bjørnemor
Andreas Alnes as Brumlemann
Steinar Sagen as Mannen and Elgen
Marit Andreassen as Kona
Frank Kjosås as Ekorn-Jensen and Kråke-Per
Eira Elise Øverås as Ekornbarnet Lise
Halvor Tverdal Rasmussen as Ekornbarnet Tom
Egil Hegerberg as Petter Pinnsvin
Katzenjammer as Fuglefamilien

Release 
In the Forest of Huckybucky was released in Norwegian cinemas on 25 December 2016 by SF Norge. It grossed NOK 22,207,627 ($2,262,755) from 225,702 admissions, making it the 19th highest-grossing film in Norway of 2016.

References

External links 

In the Forest of Huckybucky at NRK TV (in Norwegian)
In the Forest of Huckybucky at TV 2 (in Norwegian)

2016 films
2016 animated films
2010s children's animated films
Norwegian animated films
Norwegian musical films
2010s Norwegian-language films
2010s stop-motion animated films
Films directed by Rasmus A. Sivertsen